Belmont District may refer to:

Belmont District, Pennsylvania, a defunct district that existed briefly in Philadelphia County, Pennsylvania
Belmont Historic District (disambiguation), several places in the United States
Belmont, a neighborhood in Portland, Oregon, United States